Lieutenant-General Jan Arp is a senior officer in the Canadian Forces. Appointed in January 2007, he is Chief of Staff at NATO's Headquarters Supreme Allied Command Transformation.

Military career
Lieutenant-General Jan Arp originally enrolled in the Canadian Forces as an Artillery Officer, after completing his undergraduate education at a civilian university, the University of Waterloo.

Over the period 1976 to 1986, Lieutenant-General Arp served in three regiments of the Royal Canadian Horse Artillery, namely the 1st Regiment in Lahr, Germany, the 2nd Regiment in Petawawa, Ontario, and the 3rd Regiment in Shilo, Manitoba. During this period, he filled virtually all Regimental staff and command appointments up to and including Battery Commander. Subsequently, he commanded the 1st Regiment of the Royal Canadian Horse Artillery in Lahr, Germany, from 1989 to 1991.

Lieutenant-General Arp has served in a variety of staff positions in Land Requirements and in Personnel as a Major, Lieutenant-Colonel and Colonel in National Defence Headquarters (NDHQ) from 1986–89 and 1991-97. During the latter period he also served for one year as the Commander Canadian Contingent as well as the Deputy Chief of Staff of Operations for the United Nations Assistance Mission in Rwanda from 1994 to 1995.

Upon promotion to Brigadier-General in December 1997 he was appointed as the Commandant of the Canadian Land Force Command and Staff College, Kingston, Ontario. He assumed command of the Land Force Doctrine and Training System on its formation in July 1999, and was promoted to Major-General while in command. In March 2003, he took up the position of Chief of Staff (Human Resources – Military) at NDHQ.

He became the Commander Canadian Defence Liaison Staff (Washington) and Canadian Defence Attaché in the Canadian Embassy to the United States of America in July 2005. In January 2007, Lieutenant-General Arp was promoted to his current rank and appointed Chief of Staff, NATO's Headquarters Supreme Allied Command Transformation in Norfolk, Virginia.

In addition to his Bachelor of Science from the University of Waterloo, he has a Master of Public Policy and Administration from Queen's University.

Senior military key appointments 
 Promoted to the rank of brigadier general and appointed commandant of the Canadian Land Force Command and Staff College, Kingston in 1997 - 1999
 Promoted to the rank of major general and appointed commander of Land Force Doctrine and Training System in 1999 - 2002
 Appointed as Chief of Military Personnel in 2002 - 2005
 Appointed as the commander of Canadian Defence Liaison Staff and Canadian Defence Attaché in the Canadian Embassy to the United States of America in July 2005 - 2007
 Promoted to the rank of lieutenant general and appointed as chief of staff, NATO's Headquarters Supreme Allied Command Transformation in Norfolk, Virginia - 2007 - 2009

Military Awards 
 Commander and Officer of the Order of Military Merit
 Canadian Long Service Decoration With 2 Bar

References

External links 
 Senior Serving Artillery Officers Lieutenant-General J. Arp, CMM, CD

Living people
Year of birth missing (living people)
Canadian generals
University of Waterloo alumni
Queen's University at Kingston alumni
Royal Regiment of Canadian Artillery officers